Geoffrey James Nicholls (29 February 1944 – 28 January 2017) was a British guitarist and keyboardist, and longtime member of the heavy metal band Black Sabbath until 2004. Nicholls also played in the NWOBHM band Quartz before joining Black Sabbath. In the 1960s/early 1970s, Geoff played lead guitar for the Birmingham bands The Boll Weevils, The Seed, Johnny Neal and the Starliners, and played keyboards for World of Oz.

Black Sabbath 

Nicholls was originally brought in as a second guitarist when Black Sabbath doubted whether they would even continue under that name. Nicholls then switched to bass when Geezer Butler left briefly, and then became the band's keyboardist upon Butler's return and the decision to keep the Sabbath name. Nicholls' first appearance on a Black Sabbath album was on Heaven and Hell (1980), and he was credited as keyboardist on every Sabbath release from that time until 13 (2013), although he was not an official member until 1986. He remained an official member until 1991, then regained member status from 1993 to 1996. He was an unofficial member once again since the reunion with Ozzy Osbourne in 1997. Although his main role with Sabbath was on the keyboard, Nicholls also played some rhythm guitar on the reunion tours, e.g., during Iommi's solo in "Snowblind" and a few tracks during the Headless Cross (1989) and Forbidden (1995) tours.

Nicholls' touring involvement with the band ended when Adam Wakeman (a member of Ozzy Osbourne's solo band) was chosen to play keyboards during Sabbath's 2004 and 2005 tours as part of Ozzfest, and Scott Warren (Dio) handled keyboard duties on the 2007 Heaven & Hell tour.

Until his death, Nicholls played keyboards with former Black Sabbath singer Tony Martin, in his band Tony Martin's Headless Cross. Nicholls has performed on Martin's first two solo albums Back Where I Belong and Scream, and their support tours.

Death 
Nicholls died from lung cancer on 28 January 2017, aged 72, surrounded by his family. "Geoff was a real true friend and supported me all the way for nearly forty years," said Tony Iommi. "I will miss him dearly and he will live in my heart until we meet again."

Albums

Studio albums with Black Sabbath

Live albums

Compilation albums

Singles

Videos

References

External links 

 Images of Geoff Nichols at the Jonny Neal and the Starliners reunion.
 Black Sabbath Online fan site tribute.

1944 births
2017 deaths
Deaths from lung cancer in England
English heavy metal keyboardists
Black Sabbath members
Musicians from Birmingham, West Midlands
20th-century English musicians
21st-century English musicians